Christiaan Tom Neumeier (2 February 1921 – 26 December 1991) was a Dutch rower who won the European title in the double scull event in 1947, together with Henk van der Meer. They also competed at the 1948 Summer Olympics, but failed to reach the final. Neumeier was a lawyer by profession.

References

1921 births
1991 deaths
Dutch male rowers
Olympic rowers of the Netherlands
Rowers at the 1948 Summer Olympics
Rowers from Amsterdam
European Rowing Championships medalists
20th-century Dutch people